Princess Elżbieta Izabela Czartoryska (21 May 1736 – 11 November 1816), better known under her married name of Izabela Lubomirska, was a Polish noblewoman.

Life

She was the daughter of August Aleksander Czartoryski, one of the leaders of the Familia, and Maria Zofia Czartoryska. In her youth, she fell in love with her cousin, Stanisław August Poniatowski, later elected King of Poland, but was unable to marry him due to the objections of her father, who thought him not sufficiently rich or influential.

Eventually, she married Stanisław Lubomirski on 9 June 1753, later Grand Marshal of the Crown, with whom she had four children: Julia, Konstancja, Elżbieta, and Aleksandra.

She was a member of the Women's Adoption Lodge - Dobroczynność (Charity) - of the Polish Freemasons from 1783. Because of her liking for blue, which she often wore, she was called the "Blue Marquise".

She was the one of the biggest and the wealthiest landowners in the Commonwealth. Her properties included the palace in Wilanów (prior royal residence of Jan III Sobieski) near Warsaw, the palace in Ursynów (then called Rozkosz, translating as Plaisance), which she built for her daughter Aleksandra, and the Mon Coteau palace in Mokotów (today's Szustra Palace). She laid the cornerstone for the building of the National Theatre in Warsaw and initiated the reconstruction of her husband's family estate, the Łańcut Castle, in the Rococo style.

Undoubtedly, she was one of the most outstanding women in Poland in the 18th century. She took a very active part in the politics of her camp, strove both for the acquisition of foreign courts and the masses of the Polish nobility. At first, she was very fond of her youth's presumed lover, Stanisław II August, then she fought him passionately. Embittered by the failure of her actions at court, she moved to Paris, and after the outbreak of the revolution, she escaped to Vienna. Apart from her political activity, she distinguished herself as a progressive protector of peasants - she founded schools and hospitals in her estates.

She died on November 25, 1816 in Vienna. She was buried in the Währing cemetery. On September 23, 1885, due to the liquidation of the cemetery in Währing, the coffin was transported to the parish church in Łańcut, where it was buried again. Earlier, a monument of white Carrara marble was erected in the temple, funded by count Alfred Potocki.

In the Łańcut estate, she founded a distillery which exists today under the name Polmos Łańcut.

References

External links 

Elżbieta Czartoryska at the Wilanów Palace Museum

1736 births
1816 deaths
Elzbieta Czartoryska
18th-century Polish nobility
Polish Freemasons
18th-century Polish women
Polish patrons of the arts